Davud Pasha (Turkish: Koca Davud Paşa; 1446–1498), also known with the epithet "Koca", was an Ottoman Albanian general and grand vizier of the Ottoman Empire from 1482 to 1497 during the reign of Bayezid II. He became a damat ("bridegroom") to the Ottoman dynasty by marrying an Ottoman princess.

Early life 
Davud Pasha was probably a converted Muslim and formerly Christian Albanian, who during his childhood lived in Istanbul and was conscripted in the system in the ranks of the Ottoman army ( in which he was sent by his own family to make career), where he was converted to Islam.

Military campaigns 
In 1473 as Beylerbey of the Anatolian Eyalet he was one of the commanders of the Ottoman army in the decisive victory against Ak Koyunlu in the Battle of Otlukbeli.
In 1478 he was given control of the troops marching against Shkodër, Albania by Sultan Mehmed II, who marched against Krujë. Davud Pasha managed to capture the city, which was the last stronghold of the League of Lezhë, thus ending the Ottoman-Albanian Wars.

As grand vizier, he led the Ottoman army in the 1487 campaign of the Ottoman-Mamluk War. Initially Davud Pasha planned an all-out offensive expedition against the Mamluks, but his plan was cancelled by Bayezid II, who assigned him to attack the Turgutlu and Varsak tribes. When Davud Pasha reached the Turgut and Varsak territories, the Varsak leaders, including the chief of the tribe, submitted to him and swore allegiance to the Ottoman Empire.

He died in Didymoteicho on October 20, 1498, leaving behind a large estate, with which several public works were constructed.

Public works 
Davud Pasha's public works are mainly found in the Forum Arcadii area of modern Istanbul. In that area he built a mosque with 108 shops around it, a madrasa, a school, a hospice, a soup kitchen for the poor population and a public fountain dating to 1485. The whole neighborhood was consequently named after him as the Davutpaşa neighborhood, part of the Fatih district in modern times. In the Yenikapı neighborhood he built a palace, a landing stage, eleven shops and public baths. His other public works include a bedestan in Bitola and shops in Skopje and Bursa. Davud Pasha's baths in modern Skopje are the largest baths in the Balkans; in modern times they are used as an art gallery.

See also
List of Ottoman Grand Viziers

References 

15th-century Grand Viziers of the Ottoman Empire
Albanian Grand Viziers of the Ottoman Empire
15th-century births
1498 deaths
Devshirme
Year of birth unknown
Albanians from the Ottoman Empire
Damats
15th-century Albanian people